German submarine U-80 was a Type VIIC submarine of Nazi Germany's Kriegsmarine during World War II. She was laid down at the Bremer Vulkan Vegesacker Werft in Bremen as yard number 8 on 17 April 1940, launched on 11 February 1941 and commissioned on 8 April under Oberleutnant zur See Georg Staats.

U-80 spent her career as a training boat, first with the 1st U-boat Flotilla, then the 26th, 24th, 23rd and 21st flotillas. She sank or damaged no ships, but was herself sunk in a diving accident west of Pillau (now Baltiysk in modern Russia), on 28 November 1944.

Design
German Type VIIC submarines were preceded by the shorter Type VIIB submarines. U-80 had a displacement of  when at the surface and  while submerged. She had two shafts and two  propellers.

U-80 was fitted with two  torpedo tubes at the bow, fourteen torpedoes, one  SK C/35 naval gun, 220 rounds, and a  C/30 anti-aircraft gun. The boat had a complement of between forty-four and sixty.

References

Bibliography

External links
 

German Type VIIC submarines
1941 ships
U-boats commissioned in 1941
World War II submarines of Germany
U-boats sunk in 1944
Ships built in Bremen (state)
World War II shipwrecks in the Baltic Sea
Ships lost with all hands
Maritime incidents in November 1944